K is a 2012 anime series created by the animation studio GoHands and GoRA, a group consisting of seven anonymous authors known as Kōhei Azano, Tatsuki Miyazawa, Yukako Kabei, Yashichiro Takahashi, Hideyuki Furuhashi, Suzu Suzuki, and Rei Rairaku. It is directed by Shingo Suzuki, who also serves as character designer for the series. The series is set when Japan is secretly being ruled by seven Kings of psychic clans called the Seven Clans of Color. Yashiro Isana, a seemingly normal student of Ashinaka High School, is targeted by HOMRA of the Red Clan and Scepter 4 of the Blue Clan, following the murder of pacifist Tatara Totsuka from HOMRA. With the help of a highly skilled swordsman named Kuroh Yatogami and a feline Strain with the ability of sensory interference named Neko, Yashiro rediscovers his true identity as Adolf K. Weismann the First and Silver King.

K aired in Japan on MBS (Animeism block) and later on TBS, CBC, AT-X and BS-TBS from October 5, 2012 to December 28, 2012. Animax Asia also broadcast at the same time. The anime has been licensed by Viz Media in North America and by Madman Entertainment in Australia. The score was composed by Mikio Endō. The second season's opening theme is "Asymmetry" by Yui Horie and the ending theme is "Kai" by customiZ, with the exception of Episode 13, whose ending song is "Kizuna" by Angela.

Episode list

K

K: Missing Kings

K: Return of Kings

K: Seven Stories

K